Argyrotaenia pomililiana is a species of moth of the family Tortricidae. It is found in Argentina (Rio Negro, Buenos Aires).

The length of the forewings is 6.8–8.1 mm for males and 7.2–8.3 mm for females. The ground colour of the forewings is yellowish ochre with scattered brown specks. The hindwings are pale whitish yellow, tinged grey in the apical third. Adults have been recorded on wing in February, July and December.

The larvae feed on the leaves and fruit of Malus species.

Etymology
The species name refers to the host plant, apple (pomi) and the name of the entomologist who collected the holotype specimen, Liliana I. Cichón.

References

Moths described in 2004
pomililiana
Moths of South America